Lewis Cass (born 27 February 2000) is an English professional footballer who plays as a defender for  club Port Vale.

Cass was with Newcastle United from 2012 to 2022. He spent the 2020–21 season on loan at Hartlepool United, who won promotion out of the National League via the play-offs. He spent the first half of the 2021–22 season on loan at Port Vale, before joining the club permanently in July 2022.

Career

Newcastle United
Cass joined the Academy at Newcastle United from North Shields Juniors at the age of 12. He was named on the "Magpies" Premier League bench for the first time on the final day of the 2018–19 season at Fulham, in what was Rafael Benítez’s final game as manager. He was next named on the bench by new manager Steve Bruce in an FA Cup tie with Rochdale in January 2020.

On 1 October 2020, Cass joined National League club Hartlepool United on loan for the 2020–21 season. He made his first-team debut two days later as "Pools" recorded a 2–1 win over Aldershot Town. He played primarily on the right-hand side of a three-man defence at Hartlepool. He signed a new contract with Newcastle in January, keeping him tied to St James' Park until 2022. On 9 March, he was sent off 24 minutes into a 1–1 draw at Altrincham. He made a total of 37 appearances throughout the campaign, helping Hartlepool to qualify for the play-off quarter-finals in fourth-place. Hartlepool went on to secure promotion out of the play-offs, though Cass was not in the matchday squad for the final as he was recovering from a hamstring injury. Hartlepool manager Dave Challinor tried to bring back Cass to Victoria Park on loan for the following season but was unable to do so due to competition from other clubs.

Port Vale
On 12 July 2021, Newcastle United loan manager Shola Ameobi sanctioned a season-long loan move to League Two side Port Vale. He was signed by manager Darrell Clarke to compete with James Gibbons at right-back and to provide cover at centre-back. He made his debut for the "Valiants" on 10 August, coming on as a 65th-minute substitute for Dan Jones in a 2–1 defeat to Newcastle's Tyne–Wear derby rivals Sunderland in an EFL Cup first round fixture at Vale Park. He scored his first goal in professional football in a 5–1 victory over Accrington Stanley in an FA Cup first round match on 6 November. He impressed in his 27 appearances for the "Valiants", playing on the right of the back three or at wing-back, and received interest from other lower league clubs in the January transfer window before his season was cut short after he tore his ankle ligaments in training on 27 January. During his recovery time he provided scouting reports for Port Vale acting manager Andy Crosby in the North East. Port Vale went on to win promotion out of the play-offs in May, and Cass said that "I hate watching this on TV, I would rather be a part of it".

On 11 June 2022, Port Vale announced that Cass would join the club on a contract of undisclosed length from 1 July; David Flitcroft, the club's director of football, stated that "I spoke to Darrell [Clarke], Andy [Crosby] and Dean [Whitehead] and the way they all spoke about him you could see they admired him... it was a collective decision". He started four of the opening five league games of the 2022–23 season, before dropping out of the team to accommodate Will Forrester. He missed February after being sidelined with a calf strain.

Style of play
Cass is a defender who can play at right-back or centre-back.

Career statistics

References

2000 births
Living people
English footballers
Sportspeople from North Shields
Footballers from Tyne and Wear
Association football defenders
Newcastle United F.C. players
Hartlepool United F.C. players
Port Vale F.C. players
National League (English football) players
English Football League players
Association football scouts